The 1909 News of the World Match Play was the seventh News of the World Match Play tournament. It was played from Tuesday 5 to Thursday 7 October at Walton Heath Golf Club. 32 players competed in a straight knock-out competition, with each match contested over 18 holes, except for the final which was over 36 holes. The winner received £100 out of a total prize fund of £240. Tom Ball defeated Sandy Herd 7 & 5 in the final to win the tournament.

Qualification
Entry was restricted to members of the Professional Golfers' Association (PGA). Qualification was by a series of 36-hole stroke-play competitions; one for each of the seven PGA sections. The Southern section had 13 qualifiers, the Northern section 7, the Midland and the Scottish sections 4, the Irish section 2 and the Welsh and Western sections 1. Compared to 1908 one entry was allocated to the new Western section with the number of qualifiers from the Southern section reduced to 13. In the event of a tie for places there was a playoff.

The qualifiers were:

Irish section: Michael Moran, Alex Robertson
Midland section: George Coburn, Frank Coltart, Alfred Lewis, Tom Williamson
Northern section: Tom Ball, Sandy Herd, Peter McEwan Jr., Ted Ray, Herbert Riseborough, Fred Robson, Tom Simpson
Southern section: James Batley, James Braid, Arthur Butchart, George Carter, James Hepburn, Charles Johns, Charles Mayo, Arthur Mitchell, Wilfrid Reid, Jack Rowe, James Sherlock, J.H. Taylor, Harry Vardon
Scottish section: Willie Binnie, David Kinnell, Robert Thomson, Willie Watt
Western section: Ernest Foord
Welsh section: Jack Ross

Format
The format was unchanged. Matches were over 18 holes except for the final which was over 36 holes. Extra holes were played in the event of a tied match. Two rounds were played on the first day, two more on the second day with the final on the third day.

Results
Source:

Prize money
The winner received £100 and a gold medal, the runner-up £30 and a silver medal, the losing semi-finalists £15 and a bronze medal, while the third round losers received £10 and the second round losers received £5.

References

Golf tournaments in England
News of the World Match Play
News of the World Match Play
News of the World Match Play